Vsevolod Sharonov (1901–1964) was a Russian and Soviet astronomer.

Life 

He was born on March 10, 1901, in St. Petersburg. 
He died on November 26, 1964, also in St. Petersburg.

Education 

He graduated from gymnasium in 1918 and graduated from Petrograd University in 1926.

Career 

The bulk of his work was done at Pulkovo Observatory. He was appointed as a professor at the University of Leningrad and was the director of the Astronomical Observatory. His main focus and interest was in the study of planets and atmospheric optics.

Honours 

The following are named after him:

 Sharonov (Martian crater)
 Asteroid 2416 Sharonov
 Sharonov (lunar crater)

Bibliography 

He published over 300 research papers in his lifetime.

He is the author of:

 The Nature of the Planets
 Measurement and Calculations of the Visibility of Distant Objects
 Mars
 The Sun and its Observation

References

External links 

Russian astronomers
Scientists from Saint Petersburg
1901 births
1964 deaths